= Lugnet mine =

Feldspar mine in Örnö, Stockholm, Sweden

- Location in Sweden
- Location: Örnö, Stockholm, Sweden; 59°13′33.06″N 18°25′36.99″E
- Products: Feldspar
- Opened: 1911
- Closed: 1967

Lugnet was a feldspar mine near Stockholm, Sweden. Mining at Lugnet begun in 1911 and ended in 1967.
